Concord Township may refer to the following township in the U.S. state of Ohio:

 Concord Township, Champaign County, Ohio
 Concord Township, Delaware County, Ohio
 Concord Township, Fayette County, Ohio
 Concord Township, Highland County, Ohio
 Concord Township, Lake County, Ohio
 Concord Township, Miami County, Ohio
 Concord Township, Ross County, Ohio

See also
 Concord Township (disambiguation)

Ohio township disambiguation pages